Zubiria is a surname. Notable people with the surname include:

Alberto Fermín Zubiría(1901-1971), President of Uruguay
Amaia Zubiria (born 1947), Spanish Basque singer
David Garcia Zubiria (born 1994), Spanish footballer
Francisco Henríquez de Zubiría (1869-1933), Colombian-born French Olympic tug-of-war competitor
José Antonio Laureano de Zubiría (1791-1863), Bishop of Durango, Mexico

See also
Zubiri (disambiguation)

Basque-language surnames